Nakkare Ade Swarga is a 1967 Indian Kannada-language film, directed by M. R. Vittal and produced by Srikanth Nahatha and Srikanth Patel. The film stars Narasimharaju, along with Jayanthi, Shailashree, Jr. Revathi and Thara. The film has musical score by M. Ranga Rao. This film introduced singer S. P. Balasubrahmanyam to the Kannada film industry.

Cast

Jayanthi
Shailashree
Jr. Revathi
Thara
Indrani
Kamalamma
Narasimharaju
Arunkumar (Gururajulu Naidu)
Ranga
Dikki Madhava Rao
R. Nagendra Rao
Sampath in a cameo
Srirangamurthy
Rajendra Prasad
M. R. Srinivasan
Somashekar
A. V. K. Murthy
Guruswamy
Raju
Babu

Soundtrack
The music was composed by M. Ranga Rao.

References

External links 
 

1967 films
1960s Kannada-language films
Films scored by M. Ranga Rao
Films directed by M. R. Vittal